The 1995 Prix de l'Arc de Triomphe was a horse race held at Longchamp on Sunday 1 October 1995. It was the 74th running of the Prix de l'Arc de Triomphe.

The winner was Lammtarra, a three-year-old colt trained in Great Britain by Saeed bin Suroor. The winning jockey was Frankie Dettori.

Race details
 Sponsor: Forte Group
 Purse: 7,000,000 F; First prize: 4,000,000 F
 Going: Very Soft
 Distance: 2,400 metres
 Number of runners: 16
 Winner's time: 2m 31.8s

 Abbreviation: snk = short-neck

Winner's details
Further details of the winner, Lammtarra.
 Sex: Colt
 Foaled: 2 February 1992
 Country: United States
 Sire: Nijinsky; Dam: Snow Bride (Blushing Groom)
 Owner: Saeed bin Maktoum Al Maktoum
 Breeder: Gainsborough Farms

References

External links
 Colour Chart – Arc 1995

Prix de l'Arc de Triomphe
 1995
Prix de l'Arc de Triomphe
Prix de l'Arc de Triomphe
Prix de l'Arc de Triomphe